The Burt-Stark Mansion, also known as Armistead Burt House, in Abbeville, South Carolina was the site of the last Council of War of cabinet members of the Confederate government.  On May 2, 1865, Jefferson Davis, hoping to continue the struggle, met unanimous opposition, and realized the Confederate independence cause was lost.

It was declared a National Historic Landmark in 1992, specifically for being where Jefferson Davis had his last council of war.

History
The property has had seven owners.  The original owner, David Lesley, owned it until his death in 1855.  He had hired a man named Johnson, an English landscaper, to organize the property.  The next owner was a Presbyterian pastor named Thomas A. Hoyt, who owned it until 1859 when he was sent to another church in Louisville, Kentucky.  A banker from Charleston, South Carolina, Andrew Simonds, bought it from Hoyt, and in 1862 sold it to Armistead Burt, who owned it when Jefferson Davis used the building.

Davis' wife, Varina Davis, had met Armistead Burt when Jefferson Davis first entered the United States Congress in December 1845.  Burt invited Varina Davis and her children to his house, as Varina was sent away from Richmond, Virginia for her protection.  Varina pointed out to Burt that Union soldiers might eventually burn his house for harboring her, but he said there would be no greater cause then for his house to be burnt for. Varina moved to the Mansion on April 17.  Days later, after Varina had left to go further South, Davis came to the house.

On May 2, 1865, between four and six in the afternoon, Jefferson Davis held his final war council, with Secretary of War John C. Breckinridge, Secretary of State Judah P. Benjamin, and several military officers, most notable of them Braxton Bragg and Basil W. Duke.  Davis wanted to continue the fight, using the forces still plentiful west of the Mississippi River, but the others disagreed.  When Davis asked the men why they were still there, they replied it was to make sure Davis got to safety.  After fuming for several minutes, Davis resigned himself to the decision of the others, effectively ending the existence of the Confederate States of America.  However, the last land Confederate force to surrender would not be until June 24, when Stand Watie surrendered in Oklahoma; the last Confederate naval vessel surrendered at Liverpool later that year. After the Abbeville meeting, the Cabinet, Davis; a 3,000-strong protective force, and the treasury of the Confederacy dispersed.

After the war, in 1868 Burt had to sell the house due to bankruptcy. A local planter, James R. Norwood, bought it; when he died in 1875, his widow and daughter inherited it.  James Samuel Stark bought it from them in 1900, and with his wife restored the building.  On their death, their daughter Mary Stark Davis inherited it.  After Davis died in the Fall of 1987, Abbeville Historic Preservation Commission was given control of the house, and have operated tours of it ever since.

Construction
The house is a white Greek Revival style two-story house with a frame structure and lap siding.  A front pedimented portico, also two stories high, is supported by four square columns.  Underneath this is a small wooden latticework second-story balcony.  It has a brick foundation, with wooden walls.  The roof is made of aluminum and tin, with both asphalt and cedar shingles.  The shutters on all the windows are original.  There were several exterior buildings, but the only one still standing is the kitchen; the other building once on the property were a carriage house, cow barn, milk house, smokehouse, and well house.  Spacious rooms and high ceilings mark the interior. A central great hall with an Adam fanlight is the main entrance to the domicile, with a drawing room on each side.  The left drawing room would be where Jefferson Davis would hold his final war council with John C. Breckinridge, his Secretary of War, and senior military officials.  Before the War, the wide double doors would open to create a ballroom from the entire front area.  The only additions to the house after the War was a bathroom and a northwest corner wing, which provided extra kitchen space.  Most of the furnishings are from the 1850s and 1860s.

It was built in the 1830s by David Lesley, a local attorney, judge, planter, and Presbyterian Church elder.  Lesley had seen a house in the north that he liked, and chose that house as the prototype for his own.  He sent a man named Cubic, a slave that was also a master carpenter, to look at the prototype house, and he then oversaw construction of Lesley's.

References

External links

 Official site

Historic American Buildings Survey in South Carolina
National Historic Landmarks in South Carolina
Museums in Abbeville County, South Carolina
Houses on the National Register of Historic Places in South Carolina
Historic house museums in South Carolina
American Civil War museums in South Carolina
National Register of Historic Places in Abbeville County, South Carolina
Houses in Abbeville County, South Carolina